The Wassmer WA-80 Piranha is a French two-seat low-wing cabin monoplane trainer designed and built by Société Wassmer. Based on the same construction as the company's WA-50 four-seater, the WA-80 was a scaled down version. The prototype, registered F-WVKR, first flew in November 1975 powered by a 100 hp Rolls-Royce Continental O-200 engine. Wassmer appointed a receiver and suspended production in 1977 after 25 had been built.

Variants
WA-80 Piranha
Two-seater with a 100 hp Rolls-Royce Continental O-200-A engine, six built.
WA-81 Piranha
WA-80 fitted with an extra third rear seat, 18 built.

Specifications (WA-80)

References

Notes

Bibliography
 
 

1970s French civil trainer aircraft
Wassmer aircraft
Single-engined tractor aircraft
Low-wing aircraft
Aircraft first flown in 1975